The ZEN Vision:M was a portable media player developed by Creative Technology, and was launched on December 8, 2005. The device's features and interface was adapted from the earlier released ZEN Vision with a smaller screen size and dimensions.

The player is capable of audio playback, including audiobook files from Audible.com (as of firmware version 1.41.01), video playback (DivX, AVI, Xvid, MPEG-1, MPEG-2, MPEG-4 SP, WMV9 and MJPEG), mostly through external conversion via bundled software, and image display in JPEG (BMP, GIF, PNG, TIFF could be converted).

Both the 30 GB model and the 60 GB contain a built-in recordable FM radio tuner. The feature to record was pulled by a firmware update, but was reinstated in a further update in the 30 GB model only.

The ZEN Vision:M won Best of Show and Best Portable Audio & Video Device awards at the 2006 Consumer Electronics Show, as well as the Red Dot Design Award. Months later, a 60 GB model of the player was released, which included a USB host that allowed users to transfer photos from a digital camera to the Zen Vision.

On March 11, 2007, slimmer versions of the 60 GB models of the ZEN Vision:M and ZEN Vision W were released by Creative, making the players as slim as their 30 GB counterparts.

In September 2007, Creative announced the discontinuation of the ZEN Vision:M, making way for the flash-based ZEN.

Awards 
Best in Show Award - (CNET.com, January 2006)
Best of CES 2006 - MP3 and Portable Video category (CNET.com, January 2006)
Best of CES 2006 - Portable Video category (Laptop, January 2006)
Editor's Choice Award (PC Gamer, May 2006)
World Class Award (PC World, July 2006)

Specifications

See also
 Creative ZEN
 Creative Technology
 Comparison of portable media players

References

External links
 Official Product Page
 Zencast.com

Portable media players
Creative Technology products
Audiovisual introductions in 2005